Subepona is an extinct genus of gastropods belonging to the subfamily Erosariinae of the family Cypraeidae.

Species
 † Subepona amitrovi Dolin & Aguerre, 2018 
 † Subepona anhaltina (Giebel, 1861) 
 † Subepona antiqua (Lamarck, 1810) 
 † Subepona arcyensis (de Raincourt, 1876) 
 † Subepona barbei Dolin & Aguerre, 2018 
 † Subepona basilica Dolin & Aguerre, 2018 
 † Subepona berezovskyi Dolin & Aguerre, 2018 
 † Subepona brackleshamensis (Schilder, 1929) 
 † Subepona caelatura Dolin & Aguerre, 2018 
 † Subepona cattoi Dolin & Aguerre, 2018 
 † Subepona cluzaudi Pacaud, 2018 
 † Subepona dilatata Dolin & Aguerre, 2018 
 † Subepona exspectata Dolin & Aguerre, 2018 
 † Subepona fusoides Dolin & Aguerre, 2018 
 † Subepona gracillima Dolin & Aguerre, 2018 
 † Subepona harmonica Dolin & Aguerre, 2018 
 † Subepona herrerensis Dolin & Lozouet, 2004 
 † Subepona hungarica Pacaud & Vicián, 2019 
 † Subepona insolita Dolin & Aguerre, 2018 
 † Subepona javelina Dolin & Aguerre, 2018 
 † Subepona laminata Dolin & Aguerre, 2018 
 † Subepona moloni (Bayan, 1870) 
 † Subepona notabilis Dolin & Aguerre, 2018 
 † Subepona orbiculata Dolin & Aguerre, 2018 
 † Subepona pacaudi Ledon, 2018 
 † Subepona rixatoria Dolin & Aguerre, 2018 
 † Subepona romaneki Dolin & Aguerre, 2018 
 † Subepona scutula Dolin & Aguerre, 2018 
 † Subepona trigonella Dolin & Aguerre, 2018 
 † Subepona vultuosa Dolin & Aguerre, 2018 
Synonyms
 † Subepona caneveti Dolin & Aguerre, 2018: synonym of † Subepona brackleshamensis (Schilder, 1929)

References

 Dolin L. & Lozouet P. (2004). Nouvelles espèces de gastéropodes (Mollusca: Gastropoda) de l'Oligocène et du Miocène inférieur de l'Aquitaine (Sud-Ouest de la France). Partie 3. Cypraeidae et Ovulidae. Cossmanniana. Hors-série 4: 1–164.
 Lorenz, F. (2017). Cowries. A guide to the gastropod family Cypraeidae. Volume 1, Biology and systematics. Harxheim: ConchBooks. 644 pp.
 Pacaud J.M. (2018). Les Cypraeoidea (Mollusca, Caenogastropoda) du Priabonien (Éocène supérieur) de Dnipro (Oblast de Dnipropetrovsk, Ukraine). Partie 1 : Cypraeidae. Xenophora Taxonomy. 20: 14–33.

External links
 Fehse, D. (2010). New Species of fossil Cypraeoidea from Europe and Australia (Mollusca: Gastropoda). Palaeontographica Abteilung A. 292(1-3): 1-19

Cypraeidae